Dark Corners is a 2006 horror-thriller film directed by Ray Gower and starring Thora Birch.

Plot
Birch plays two characters, alternating between them each time she falls asleep, each of whom believes that the other is a dream. The first of them, Karen Clarke, is a mortuary worker who awakes to find that she has injuries which she does not recall receiving, and the second is Susan Hamilton, an office worker who is preparing to undergo artificial insemination. As time passes Clarke's world becomes increasingly nightmarish, with a corpse coming to life on her table and a serial killer stalking her, and the line between the two worlds becomes increasingly fragile.

Cast
Thora Birch as Susan Hamilton / Karen Clarke
Toby Stephens as Dr. Woodleigh
Christien Anholt as David Hamilton
Joanna Hole as Elaine Jordan
Glenn Beck as Mr. Saunders

External links
 Official site
 

2006 films
2006 horror films
2006 psychological thriller films
British psychological thriller films
2000s English-language films
2000s British films